Kim Chol (born  1960) worked as a Vice Minister in the North Korean Army. He was allegedly purged and executed in spectacular fashion for “drinking and carousing” during the period of mourning for Kim Jong-il.  South Korean media reported that he was exploded by mortar bombardment, and not shot by firing squad. However, Foreign Policy observed the claims probably originated from gossip and noted that stories about violent deaths of North Korean elites tend to be "exaggerated."

Kim was one of 14 senior party, military, and government officials who were purged during Kim Jong-un's consolidation of power.

See also
 Media coverage of North Korea

References

Possibly living people
21st-century executions by North Korea
North Korean military personnel
Workers' Party of Korea politicians
Purges in North Korea
Korean communists
Year of birth uncertain
2012 deaths
Government ministers of North Korea
People executed for treason against North Korea